Madras Bashai (Tamil:) was the variety of the Tamil language spoken by native people in the city of Madras (officially known as Chennai today) in the Indian state of Tamil Nadu. It was sometimes considered a pidgin, as its vocabulary was heavily influenced by Hindustani, Indian English, Telugu, Malayalam, and Burmese; it is not mutually intelligible with any of those except for Tamil, to a certain extent.

Since the advent of urbanization of the city especially since the Indian Independence, due to large immigrations into the city from different parts of Tamil Nadu, the Madras Bashai variety has become closer to normalized standard spoken Tamil. Today, the transformed variety is majorly called as Chennai Tamil.

Madras Bashai evolved largely during the past three centuries. It grew in parallel with the growth of cosmopolitan Madras. After Madras Bashai became somewhat common in Madras, it became a source of satire for early Tamil films from the 1950s, in the form of puns and double entendres. Subsequent generations in Chennai identified with it and absorbed English constructs into the dialect, making it what it is today's Chennai Tamil.

Etymology 

The phrase Madras Bhashai is a Hindostani compound word, where the Arabic word madrās is short for the city of madrāsa-paṭnā ( city of education), and bhāṣā is the Sanskrit word for "language".

Evolution 

Madras Bashai evolved largely during the past three centuries. With its emergence as an important city in British India when they recovered it from the French and as the capital of Madras Presidency, the contact with western world increased and a number of English words crept into the vocabulary. Many of these words were introduced by educated, middle-class Tamil migrants to the city who borrowed freely from English for their daily usage. Due to the presence of a considerable population of Telugu, Hindi–Urdu and many other language-speakers, especially, the Gujaratis, Marwaris and some Muslim communities, some Hindustani and Telugu words, too, became a part of Madras Bashai.  At the turn of the 20th century, though preferences have since shifted in favor of the Central and Madurai Tamil dialects, the English words introduced during the early 20th century have been retained.

Madras Bashai is generally considered a dialect of the working class like the Cockney dialect of English. Lyrics of gaana songs make heavy use of Madras Bashai.

Vocabulary 

A few words unique to Madras Bashai are given below; an Internet project, urban Tamil, has set out to collect urban Tamil vocabulary.

 Words borrowed from other languages

In film 
Madras Bashai is used in many Tamil movies after the 1950s. Actors such, Manorama, J. P. Chandrababu, Loose Mohan, Thengai Srinivasan, Janagaraj, Cho Ramaswamy, Rajinikanth, Kamal Haasan, Vijay Sethupathi, Dhanush, Suriya, Santhanam, Vikram, Attakathi Dinesh, Vijay and Ajith Kumar are well known for using it. Representative films are Maharasan, Michael Madana Kama Rajan, Thirumalai, Vasool Raja MBBS, Attahasam, Pammal K. Sambandam, Chennai 600028, Siva Manasula Sakthi, Theeradha Vilaiyattu Pillai,  Saguni, Attakathi, Theeya Velai Seiyyanum Kumaru, Idharkuthane Aasaipattai Balakumara, Ai, Madras, Kasethan Kadavulada, Anegan, Vedalam, Maari, Maari 2, Aaru, Sketch, Vada Chennai and Bigil.

External links 

 Chennai Slang - List of words

See also 
 Madrassi
 Tanglish

Notes 

Languages of Tamil Nadu
Tamil dialects
English-based pidgins and creoles
Culture of Chennai
Indian slang
Mixed languages